Miklós Kovács may refer to:
 Miklós Kovács (automobile designer), Hungarian car designer
 Miklós Kovács (footballer) (1911–1977), Romanian-Hungarian football player and coach
 Miklós Kovács (poet) (1857–1937), Hungarian Slovene cantor and writer
 Miklós Kovács (sport shooter) (born 1934), Hungarian Olympic shooter
 Mór Kóczán or Miklós Kovács (1885–1972), Hungarian athlete and Calvinist pastor
 Miklós Kovács (1769–1852), Catholic bishop of Transylvania and censor of Journey in North America